Peter Facklam (23 April 1930 – 2 February 2023) was a Swiss politician.

Facklam died in Basel on 2 February 2023, at the age of 92.

References

1930 births
2023 deaths
Liberal Party of Switzerland politicians
Swiss civil servants
University of Basel alumni
University of Geneva alumni
Politicians from Basel-Stadt